Ø (Disambiguation) is the seventh studio album by American rock band Underoath. Released on November 9, 2010, through Tooth & Nail Records,  the album was the band's only without founding member Aaron Gillespie, and is the first and only record by the band with Daniel Davison, formerly of Norma Jean. It was also their final album before a two-year breakup from 2013 to 2015. They would not release another studio album until 2018's Erase Me. Ø (Disambiguation) was met with acclaim and was recorded at Glow in the Dark Studios in Atlanta, Georgia, the same studio where the band's previous album, Lost in the Sound of Separation was recorded.

Recording and production
During a late 2009 interview, guitarist Timothy McTague stated that the band had "just started writing songs that may be included on the next record", and that they are hoping to enter the studio late summer or early fall 2010. On April 5, 2010, the band announced the departure of drummer and vocalist, Aaron Gillespie. On May 12, 2010, Underoath announced that they will be entering the studio on May 24, 2010 to record their next session. They recruited ex–Norma Jean drummer Daniel Davison for drumming duties. Sessions were held at Glow in the Dark Studios in Atlanta, Georgia with producers Matt Goldman and Jeremy Griffith. The drum tracks were edited by Justin Chapman, before being mixed by Ben Grosse at The Mix Room in Burbank, California. Ted Jensen then mastered the recordings at Sterling Sound.

Release and promotion
In July and August 2010, the band appeared on the Cool Tour alongside As I Lay Dying and Between the Buried and Me. A postcard containing a piece of the artwork was sent to each person who pre-ordered the album. The buyer was to take a picture of that postcard and upload it to Underoath's official website. Once every piece had been uploaded, the band would release the artwork. They did so at 1 pm EST, September 21, 2010.

Underoath hosted a game on their Twitter and Facebook profiles. It consisted of scrambled titles for tracks featured on the album. The first person who unscrambled the words won an Underoath T-shirt. The band also released one of their new songs, "Illuminator", by layers, giving away one instrument's part at a time. The song was fully uploaded on October 1, 2010. The second song Underoath released was the single "In Division" on November 2.

The band also developed a contest for the track "Catch Myself Catching Myself". The song was uploaded to YouTube on October 28; however, all the vocals were taken out. The lyrics were put up in the video, and viewers were told to put their own vocals over the song and upload it to YouTube. The submission chosen to be best would receive an Underoath prize pack containing a shirt, poster, stickers and more, and the guitar used for the video of "In Division". Two runners-up would receive the prize pack only.

A music video for "In Division" was released on November 1, 2010.

A music video for "Paper Lung" was released on April 25, 2011.

Reception

Ø (Disambiguation) was met with positive reviews from music critics. At Metacritic, which assigns a normalized rating out of 100 to reviews from mainstream publications, the album received an average score of 83, based on eight reviews.

In its first week, Ø (Disambiguation) sold 24,000 and debuted at No. 23 on the Billboard 200 charts.

Track listing
All music written by Underoath. All lyrics by Spencer Chamberlain.

Personnel
Personnel per booklet.

Underoath
 Christopher Dudley – keyboards, programming
 Daniel Davison – drums
 Grant Brandell – bass guitar
 James Smith – guitar
 Spencer Chamberlain – lead vocals
 Timothy McTague – guitar

Additional musicians
 Jeremy Griffith – additional bass guitar (track 5)

Production
 Matt Goldman – producer, engineer
 Jeremy Griffith – producer, engineer
 Ben Grosse – mixing
 Ted Jensen – mastering
 Justin Chapman – assistance, drum editing
 Joe Butler – studio assistance
 Jordan Butcher – art direction, design, collage
 Underoath – art direction
 Brandon Ebel – executive producer

Charts

References

Underoath albums
Tooth & Nail Records albums
Albums produced by Matt Goldman
2010 albums